Vuka Šeherović (née Šekerović, ; 1903–1976) was a Bosnian folk singer and sevdalinka interpreter. She was called the "woman with the silver voice."

Biography
Šeherović was born with the surname Šekerović in the village Kovačići near Zenica in 1903. Her father Risto Šekerović was a prison guard at the Zenica prison. A young Vuka sang in her schools choir starting at age seven.

Her career began in 1919, aged 16, when she won a talent contest in Brčko. Šeherović later sang in Belgrade's bohemian quarter Skadarlija and in her husband's kafana while simultaneously making appearances on radio shows including Bosansko veče (Bosnian Nights) and recording for major record labels like Odeon Records, Polydor Records and Jugoton. Later in her career, she performed with younger generations of singers such as Zehra Deović.

References

External links
Vuka Šeherović discography at Discogs

1903 births
1976 deaths
Musicians from Zenica
Serbs of Bosnia and Herzegovina
Yugoslav women singers
Sevdalinka